Guioa palawanica is a species of plant in the family Sapindaceae. It is endemic to the Philippines, in Palawan.

References

palawanica
Endemic flora of the Philippines
Flora of Palawan
Critically endangered flora of Asia
Taxonomy articles created by Polbot